Reid Street–North Confederate Avenue Area Historic District is a national historic district located at Rock Hill, South Carolina.  It encompasses 22 contributing buildings in a middle-class residential section of Rock Hill. The district developed between about 1839 and 1935. Architectural styles represented include Victorian, Classical Revival, Queen Anne, and Bungalow.  Notable buildings include the Steed House (c. 1905), Bynum House (c. 1902), Jenkins House (c. 1905), and Gross-Brock House (c. 1905), along with the separately listed White House.

It was listed on the National Register of Historic Places in 1992.

References

Historic districts on the National Register of Historic Places in South Carolina
Houses on the National Register of Historic Places in South Carolina
Victorian architecture in South Carolina
Queen Anne architecture in South Carolina
Neoclassical architecture in South Carolina
Buildings and structures in Rock Hill, South Carolina
National Register of Historic Places in Rock Hill, South Carolina
Houses in York County, South Carolina